Bamsi Beyrek is a character in the Book of Dede Korkut and in Turkish, Azeri and some Altai legends. Despite his stories being far-stretched, it is believed that he may have indeed been a real person.

Beyrek's character has also been adapted in the Turkish TV series, Diriliş: Ertuğrul, and its sequel, Kuruluş: Osman, by the same actor in both series, Nurettin Sönmez. Burak Aksak also named one of his films "Bamsı Beyrek" about a love experienced in Oghuz Turks. 
The film is centered around Legend II of the Book of Dede Korkut, the dastan is mainly about Bamsi. In Bamsı Beyrek, he is portrayed by Uraz Kaygılaroğlu.

In the Book of Dede Korkut

Character and appearance 
He was also one of the four most handsome men of all the Oghuz noblemen, but was quite emotional, and he took irrational steps sometimes. His horse's name was Dengiboz or Bengiboz, and it was grey in colour.

Storyline

Birth and "how he got his name" 

Legend II ( or Bamsi Beyrek of the Grey Horse according to translator Geoffrey Lewis) is centered around Beyrek. In the legend, it says that once the Oghuz princes all gathered somewhere. The father of Beyrek, Bay Büre, wept when he saw everyone had a son besides him. The princes asked why he was crying, he replied that it was because he doesn't have a son to carry on his family. The princes all started to pray that Bay Büre would get a son.  also prayed that he would get a daughter that he would marry to Bay Büre's son. And they sooner or later got the children they wanted. 

Bamsi got his name after Bay Büre sent his merchants to bring some presents. As time went by, the merchants arrived in Constantinople and bought some items, however, on their way back to Bay Büre, they were attacked by some infidels. The son of Bay Büre himself came and helped the merchants by killing all the infidels who attacked them. The son of Bay Büre didn't have any name as an Oghuz Turk was given his name when he beheaded an infidel. So the son of Bay Büre decided to receive these presents from his father instead of introducing himself. When the merchants came back to Bay Büre, they started kissing the young man's hand, the young man had already arrived and didn't tell his father about anything. The merchants then realised that the young man was the son of their great Khan, Bay Büre Khan. They also told Bay Büre about what had happened in the infidels' attack, and the young man's father found out that his son had cut off the heads of his enemies. Then the young man was given the name of Bamsi Beyrek in a gathering of the Oghuz princes.

First marriage 

After he got his name, Bamsi Beyrek met with the daughter of Bay Bichen, her name was Banu Chichek. After Beyrek gave a deer to Banu's nurse, they spent some time together after which both of them learned more about each other, they even have a disagreement in which both had an arm wrestle. Bamsi Beyrek also gave her a golden ring as a sign of their engagement. When Bamsı Beyrek went back to his father, his father was already aware of his desire. And after passing a lot of resistances, including having to face Yaltajuk, Banu's evil lover who convinced everyone that Bamsi was dead, Bamsi Beyrek happily got his love, Banu Chichek, and married her.

Korkut appeared as a character in this epic, he helped Bamsi outwit Chichek's evil brother, Crazy Karchar. Karchar later repented.

Abduction and death

He was then later mentioned again in Legend XI, this epic was focused on a civil war which happened between the Outer Oghuz and the Inner Oghuz. Once every three years, Kazan Khan lets both branches of the Oghuz nobles come to his tent and take anything they wish. One year, he lets the Inner Oghuz come to his tent before the Outer Oghuz arrived. The Outer Oghuz nobles were outraged at being slighted, and they swear enmity to Prince Kazan. Beyrek was from the Inner Oghuz and his wife was from the Outer Oghuz. , the Bey of the Outer Oghuz, invites Bamsi Beyrek, his son-in-law, to join the rebels in an effort to test his loyalty. Beyrek refuses to rebel against Kazan, and Uruz kills him. Kazan and the Inner Oghuz come to the Outer Oghuz to avenge Beyrek's death. In the ensuing fight, Kazan kills Uruz Koja. The Outer Oghuz nobles beg Kazan's forgiveness, which he grants, and Uruz Koja's house and lands are pillaged.

Notes

TV adaptation

This section documents his adaptation into the Turkish TV series, Diriliş:  Ertuğrul and Kuruluş: Osman. In the series, his name is spelt in Turkish as "Bamsı Beyrek". All information related to his wife Hafsa is also documented here, along with his children Aybars and Aslıhan.

Storyline
His story begins in Diriliş: Ertuğrul where, having been orphaned after the Mongols kill his family offscreen, including his father Altuğ, he is raised by Hayme Hatun and Süleyman Şah, and becomes a close friend and companion of Ertuğrul Bey.

Season 1–4

The character features as a supporting character in the first two seasons, mainly fighting alongside his adoptive brothers, Doğan and Turgut, and his "Bey", Ertuğrul. In season 3, Bamsı, who at first did not want to get married and thought of his horse and swords as his family, meets a Byzantine Tekfur's daughter, Helena, who he falls in love with at first sight. Helena's father, Andros, had been killed by his own adoptive son, Vasilius. Vasilius, thinking that he could manipulate Helena into marrying him, starts a feud with Bamsı together with his soldier, Teo. However, Bamsı later reveals the truth about Vasilius to Helena and marries her. Ertuğrul also kills Vasilius later in a fight, whilst Helena converts to Islam and takes the name 'Hafsa'. Bamsı is later devastated after his adoptive brother and best friend Doğan is killed by Vasilius and Ural Bey. In season 4, he becomes the Chief Alp, succeeding his adoptive brother, Turgut. He has tensions with Turgut in season 4 after disagreeing over security measures implemented by Turgut as the Çavdar Bey, which allow a pregnant Hafsa to be kidnapped by Titan, but they eventually ally together to catch the traitor in the Kayı tribe, Marya Hatun, wife of Artuk Bey. Both Turgut and Bamsı later help Ertuğrul Bey and Sungur Bey against Sadettin Köpek and Baycu Noyan.

Season 5

In the fifth season, Bamsı and Hafsa appear with two children, Aslıhan, who is skilled with a sword and named after Turgut's martyred wife Aslıhan Hatun, and Aybars, who at first loves to read and study but later, to please his father, starts using a sword more often too. Hafsa constantly attempts to convince Bamsı to leave the Kayı when she has tensions with Selcan Hatun, Ertuğrul's sister-in-law, who only has tensions with her because of stress over what had been happening to her husband and sons in Ahlat. The misunderstandings between the two escalate because of the devious Sırma of the Umuroğlu, whose brother Beybolat had been the cause of the problems faced by Selcan's family. Following a failed ambush because of Bamsı, he has his position as Chief Alp taken for a while as a punishment. Bamsı, ever caring for his wife and children, is led into a trap set by Dragos, an evil former Byzantine Commander, when attempting to save his son Aybars, kidnapped by Dragos. As the season progresses, Sırma is killed, Bamsı becomes the Chief Alp again, and Hafsa and Selcan's misunderstandings are resolved.

In Kuruluş: Osman

After 10 or 15 years, after Hafsa and Aslıhan die in a plague and Aybars is also martyred, Beyrek becomes a close companion of Ertuğrul's son Osman, joining him in battles and helping him become the Bey of the tribe. He also helps convert Aybars' killer, Salvador, to Islam, giving him the name 'Sıddık', and adopting him as his son. After Sıddık is martyred by Princess Sofia, Bamsı mourns for him as much as he did for Aybars. He also becomes upset upon Ertuğrul's death, with the actor, Nurettin Sönmez, saying he was left "teary-eyed". Bamsı later loyally supports Osman in becoming the Bey of the Kayı tribe, as well as protecting Ertuğrul's plans for Anatolia to hand over to Osman. He is later martyred by Kara Şaman Togay, the son of his old enemy Baycu Noyan, devastating his protege Cerkutay.

Personality and other information
Bamsı Beyrek is a very loving person, especially to his wife and children, he would count the days since they died and wouldn't stop remembering them for anything. He also treated his adoptive son, Sıddık, with as much love as he did for his son, Aybars. He was jolly nearly all the time, had a funny character by nature, and would joke a lot. His fighting style was also unique as he used two swords rather than one, and he was an aggressive warrior.

His official character description on the TRT 1 website states; "An indispensable alp of the Kayi tribe, Bamsi is a skilled soldier who can fight with double swords. Despite his fierce looks, he has a kind heart inside."

In Diriliş: Ertuğrul, Banu Chichek also made an appearance, however, she married Beyrek's best friend, Doğan Alp. In the same way, another character from the Book of Dede Korkut, Selcan Hatun, also made an appearance in the series. Selcan later appeared again in the sequel to the show, Kuruluş: Osman, with Bamsı. Both the Dumrul Alps in the two series are loosely based on 'Deli Dumrul' from the Book of Dede Korkut.

Reception
As Diriliş: Ertuğrul was well received in Pakistan, Nurettin Sönmez, along with Ayberk Pekcan, who plays the role of Artuk Bey, arrived in the country to meet fans in 2020 on a three-day visit. They came with Turkish Foreign Minister Mevlüt Çavuşoğlu and a 20-member delegation. On their visit, they met Pakistani actor Hamza Ali Abbasi's sister Dr. Fazeela Abbasi and Nurettin Sönmez was "humbled" by Pakistani Prime Minister Imran Khan's appreciation for Diriliş: Ertuğrul while also expressing his desire to work with Pakistani actors. On the occasion, Ayberk Pekcan said, “...Pakistan and Turkey are brotherly countries, people of both countries are also brothers and Pakistan is our second homeland...” Before leaving, they also visited the Pak-Turk Maarif Chak Shahzad Campus, in Islamabad. Cengiz Coşkun, who plays the role of Turgut Alp, and Nurettin Sönmez, also signed endorsement deals with one of Pakistan's leading brands Junaid Jamshed J. His character is much-loved by Pakistani actor Imran Ashraf.

 who played the role of Hafsa Hatun went viral on Pakistani social media after she sang the song Musafir by Pakistani singer, Atif Aslam. The conversation between Bamsı Bey and Cerkutay revolving around the Islamic prophet Muhammad in the 42nd episode of Kuruluş: Osman was also the centre of the conversation on social media at the time, it was declared "heart-touching" by fans.

Accolades
Nurettin Sönmez, who plays the role of Bamsı Beyrek, has received numerous awards and nominations for his role. These include his nomination for the Turkey Youth Awards in 2017 in the category Best Supporting TV Actor for his role in Diriliş: Ertuğrul.

Notes

Grave 

A grave marked as 'Bey Böyrek Bamsi Beyrek Turbesi' is in the village of Erenli (Beyrek was also captured by the castle of the same name of the city the village was centred in, Bayburt) in modern Turkey. This grave is thought to be Beyrek's, however, it could be of someone with the same name. Even though, Bamsi is traditionally thought to be fictional, it is believed by some people that he was indeed a real person because of this grave. Dede Korkut's grave is said to be in the village of Masat, however, he is also likely to be fictional.

See also
List of Diriliş: Ertuğrul characters
List of Kuruluş: Osman characters

References 

Characters in the Book of Dede Korkut